Yuri Dyulgerov (born 8 June 1965) is a Bulgarian rower. He competed in the men's eight event at the 1988 Summer Olympics.

References

External links
 

1965 births
Living people
Bulgarian male rowers
Olympic rowers of Bulgaria
Rowers at the 1988 Summer Olympics
Rowers from Sofia